(born July 11, 1956) is a Japanese screenwriter, anime director and sound director born in Tokyo. He is most well known for directing the first three entries in Sunrise's Brave series and directing the first shotacon anime adaptation. 

Series he has worked on:
Anime Ganbare Goemon (TV): Director
Armored Trooper Votoms: The Last Red Shoulder (OVA): Storyboard
Boku no Pico (OVA): Director
Brave Exkaiser (TV): Director, Storyboard (eps 26, 41)
Dinosaur King (TV): Director
Burn Up Scramble (TV): Storyboard (ep 3), Episode Director (eps 3,7,11)
Dirty Pair (OVA): Director, Storyboard (eps 6, 9), Episode Director (ep 6)
F (TV): Episode Director
Gakuen Alice (TV): Storyboard, Episode Director
Grappler Baki Maximum Tournament (TV): Series director
Gundress (movie): Director
Hanbun no Tsuki ga Noboru Sora (TV) : Episode Director
Hikaru no Go (TV): Episode Director (Ep 21, 29, 37, 53, 63, 73), Art (Ep 73)
Kakyuusei 2: Anthology (OVA): Director, Storyboard
Keraku-no-oh (OVA): Director
Kon'nichiwa Anne: Before Green Gables (TV): Director, Storyboard (eps 1, 39)
Mobile Suit Gundam Seed (TV): Unit Director
Mobile Suit Gundam Seed Destiny (TV): Storyboard, Episode Director
Mobile Suit Gundam SEED Astray (OVA Promo): Director, Storyboard
Mobile Suit Gundam ZZ (TV): Storyboard
Muka Muka Paradise (TV): Director
Oishinbo (TV): Storyboard
Shin Hakkenden (TV): Series director
Space Runaway Ideon (TV): Episode Director
Strawberry Panic! (TV): Episode Director (ep 15)
Tantei Gakuen Q (TV): Storyboard, Episode Director
The Brave Fighter of Legend Da-Garn (TV): Director
The Brave Fighter of Sun Fighbird (TV): Director
The New Adventures of Gigantor (TV): Episode Director (eps 35, 42, 47)

External links

Anime directors
Anime screenwriters
Audio directors
Living people
1956 births
Sunrise (company) people